NMAA may refer to:

 National Military Academy of Afghanistan
 National Museum of African Art, a Smithsonian Institution museum
 Navy Mutual Aid Association
 New Mexico Activities Association